Garnett Bridge is a hamlet in Cumbria, England, on the River Sprint. It is located three miles by foot southeast of Long Sleddale. It consists mainly of old mill cottages and Bobbin Mill and a quaint old bridge over the Sprint.

References

Hamlets in Cumbria
South Lakeland District